Intuit India is a fully owned subsidiary(Branch) of Intuit Inc. USA. Located in the southern city of Bangalore (also known as the Silicon Valley of India), the India office was started in April 2005. Currently it has around more than 500 employees. It is one of the two development centers of Intuit outside the USA, along with Intuit Canada.

A 26 July 2007 Techwhack article (among others) said Intuit-India would expand in international markets, including India, China, Russia, and Brazil. Nilesh Thakker, country manager for India, said there was huge opportunity in these nations. Intuit India is working on point-of-sale software for the Indian market and considering hosted versions of products in India, including online banking services for banks. 

In March 2009, Intuit announced that it would launch its software products for the Indian market soon.

In Dec 2009, Intuit Inc. and Web 18's moneycontrol.com announced to provide Personal Finance Management Solutions in India and they signed a three-year partnership to provide a new financial management tool to Indian consumers on India's leading financial portal moneycontrol.com.

Intuit Money Manager
In January 2010, Intuit India  released Intuit Money Manager, the company's first financial software product developed specifically for consumers in India. The web-based Intuit Money Manager is an innovative personal finance tool. This portal aggregated information from multiple bank accounts and credit card accounts. Once connected the portal tracked transactions across bank accounts, credit cards and loan transactions and balances through an interface.

Intuit Money Manager's beta version was launched through MoneyControl in the last week of August 2009. The product was then relaunched in Jan 2011 in partnership with ICICI Bank. In 2013, ICICI Bank replaced Intuit Money Manager with Yodlee's MoneyCenter which is branded as "My Money from ICICI".

Awards and recognition 
 Intuit India has been ranked No.1 in the "India's Best Companies to Work For – 2017" list, and ranked No. 1 in the Information Technology category.
 It has also been recognized as one of the best companies in the Employee Wellness and Employer Branding categories (2017).

References

Bibliography
Blog- https://web.archive.org/web/20100428090919/http://www.watblog.com/2010/01/20/intuit-launches-india-specific-online-money-manager-will-it-click-review/
Blog - https://web.archive.org/web/20100824062040/http://www.ciol.com/SMB/SMB-Featured-Articles/Feature/Intuit-Money-Manager-set-to-make-India-debut/21109127197/0/
Blog -  
News - 
Blog - https://web.archive.org/web/20100115173342/http://www.pitchengine.com/intuitindiasoftwaresolutionspvtltd/intuit-money-manager-launched-in-india/40847 
Article - http://www.indianotes.com/valuenotes/research/viewarticle.asp?Id=858&Cat=I&Current=2&ArticleCd=150912
Article - http://hackerstreet.in/item?id=3499

External links
 Intuit India Official site

Software companies of India
Indian subsidiaries of foreign companies
Indian companies established in 2005
Intuit
Information technology companies of Bangalore
Financial software
Intuit software
Companies based in Bangalore
2005 establishments in Karnataka